10 Days Off was an electronic music festival held in Ghent, Belgium. It began in 1995 as a 10-day-long Belgian celebration of techno music and grew to be a yearly club event until 2014. In 2001, the Amsterdam-based spin-off music and arts festival called 05 Days Off had its inaugural edition.

See also
List of electronic music festivals

References

External links

Music festivals established in 1995
Culture of Ghent
Events in Ghent